Hjerm station is a railway station serving the railway town of Hjerm in Jutland, Denmark.

Hjerm station is located on the Esbjerg-Struer Line. The station was opened in 1866 with the opening of the Struer-Holstebro section of the Esbjerg-Struer Line. It offers direct InterCityLyn services to Copenhagen operated by DSB as well as regional train services to Skjern, Fredericia, Aarhus and Struer operated by Arriva.

See also
 List of railway stations in Denmark

References

External links

 Banedanmark – government agency responsible for maintenance and traffic control of most of the Danish railway network
 DSB – largest Danish train operating company
 Arriva – British multinational public transport company operating bus and train services in Denmark
 Danske Jernbaner – website with information on railway history in Denmark

Railway stations opened in 1866
Railway stations in the Central Denmark Region
Railway stations in Denmark opened in the 19th century